Western Indiana Community Foundation ("WICF") was incorporated on November 30, 1990 for the betterment of Fountain County, Indiana and Vermillion County, Indiana and its citizens.  The community foundation is a U.S. registered 501(c)(3) non-profit charity (Federal Employer Identification Number: 35-1814927).

The Foundation provides administrative, governance, public relations and marketing support for four affiliate foundations.  These affiliates include:
 Attica Community Foundation
 Covington Community Foundation
 Southeast Fountain Community Foundation
 Vermillion County Community Foundation

In Fountain County, each affiliate serves the geographic area of the local school district, but has no formal associations with the school corporations.

Foundation characteristics 
The six main characteristics of the Western Indiana Community Foundation are:

 Act as a grant-making foundation:  Give grants to support community projects including: arts, culture and historic preservation, parks and recreation, education and scholarships, faith, senior citizen and youth activities.
 Broadly defined mission:  Improve the quality of life in Fountain County and Vermillion County, IN.
 Serve geographically defined areas: The Attica Community Foundation serves the Attica community and its surrounding townships of Davis, Logan and Shawnee; Covington Community Foundation serves the Covington community and its surrounding townships of Fulton, Mound, Troy and Wabash; Southeast Fountain Community Foundation serves the communities of Hillsboro, Kingman, Mellott, Newtown, Veedersburg, and Wallace, and the townships of Cain, Jackson, Mill Creek, Richland and Van Buren.  The Vermillion County Community Foundation serves all of Vermillion County, Indiana including the communities of Cayuga, Clinton, Dana, Fairview Park, Newport, Perrysville, and Universal, and the townships of Clinton, Eugene, Helt, Highland and Vermillion.
 Supported by a broad range of private as well as public donors and seek philanthropic contributions from those living inside the community and those who may have moved out of the area but benefited by being a part of the community at one time.
 Governed by four distinct local boards reflecting the diversity within each area served.
 Build capital endowment, which is an important element of sustainability.

It is a combination of all these basic characteristics that makes WICF a true community foundation, although there are other types of community organizations in Fountain and Vermillion County that have some of these characteristics.

Giving 
The affiliates of the Western Indiana Community Foundation (Attica, Covington, Southeast Fountain, and Vermillion County Community Foundation) have endowment funds open to receive gifts.  An Endowment Fund is a fund in which monetary gifts are placed and invested.  The amounts contributed as donations are pooled together and endowed meaning the donations are locked in and never spent.  The earnings on the donations (endowed funds) are what are issued as grants.

Any individual can create a named fund with the Foundation.  Payouts and scholarships begin when the fund has reached a pre-determined level for a full calendar year.

The choice of fund type lies entirely with the donor.  The four key choices are:

Choice 1. The charitable purpose such as:
 Citizenship
 Cemeteries
 Human Services
 The Environment
 Parks and Recreation
 Economic Development
 Education and Scholarships
 Churches and other Religious Purposes
 Arts, Culture and Historic Preservation

Choice 2. The designation of the geographic area to benefit from and hold a gift:
 Attica Community Foundation
 Covington Community Foundation
 Southeast Fountain Community Foundation
 Vermillion County Community Foundation

Choice 3. The type of Charitable Fund the donor wishes to establish:
 Endowed (Permanent) Fund (a fund in which the principal is preserved and invested).  A portion of the earnings is utilized annually to provide grants or scholarships according to the wishes of the founding contributor(s).
 Non-Endowed (Pass-Through) Fund (a fund in which all monies donated are intended to be spent in their entirety)

Families, individuals, business, and nonprofit groups can establish from a wide-variety of charitable funds within the Foundation.  Some of these include:
 Donor advised funds
 Scholarship funds
 Agency funds
 Unrestricted funds
 Field of Interest fund

Choice 4. The manner in which the donor will make a gift to the fund.  A gift may be "Current" or "Deferred."
Current gifts may include:
 Cash
 Stock
 Life insurance
 Real estate
 Private foundation transfers
 Royalties
 Trust funds
 Retirement plan Assets

Deferred gifts may include:
 Charitable gift annuity
 Life estate
 Charitable trust
 Gifts Through a Will or Trust

Grantmaking 
In Fountain County, the Western Indiana Community Foundation (Attica, Covington and Southeast Fountain Community Foundations) focuses its attention on local needs within the geographic boundaries of each school corporation. In Vermillion County, the needs of the entire County are addressed in its entirety.

The grants committee of each community foundation reviews each grant request in preparation for the monthly review by the respective board of directors.  Grant applications may be submitted at any time throughout the year. Applicants are notified immediately following the board decision.

The Foundation has a strong focus on:
Startup costs for new programs
One-time projects or needs
Capital needs beyond an applicant's capabilities

Investing 
The Investment Committee provides oversight of all assets donated to the Foundation.  The total value of WICF's investments is referred to as the Foundation's endowment. On December 31, 2022 the value of the endowment was approximately $32M.

External links 
 
Council on Foundations
Indiana Philanthropy Alliance
The Foundation Center
GuideStar
Explore Fountain County 
Explore Vermillion County

Fountain County, Indiana
Community foundations based in the United States
Non-profit organizations based in Indiana
Vermillion County, Indiana